Orland is an unincorporated community in Treutlen County, in the U.S. state of Georgia.

History
A post office called Orland was established in 1902, and remained in operation until 1933.

The Georgia General Assembly incorporated Orland as a town in 1908. The town's municipal charter was dissolved in 1915.

References

Former municipalities in Georgia (U.S. state)
Unincorporated communities in Treutlen County, Georgia
Populated places disestablished in 1915